Borkhausenia fuscescens is a moth of the family Oecophoridae. It is found in Europe.

The wingspan is 7–12 mm. The head is rather dark fuscous, face whitish-fuscous. Forewings light fuscous, coarsely irrorated with dark fuscous; stigmata large, dark fuscous, first discal before plical. Hindwings are grey. The moth flies from July to August depending on the location.

The larvae feed on a wide range of dried plant matter such as dead leaves and birds' nests.

References

External links
 Borkhausenia fuscescens at UKmoths

Oecophorinae
Moths of Europe
Moths described in 1828